Geniostemon is a genus of flowering plants belonging to the family Gentianaceae.

Its native range is Northeastern Mexico.

Species:

Geniostemon atarjanus 
Geniostemon coulteri 
Geniostemon gypsophilus 
Geniostemon rotundifolius 
Geniostemon schaffneri

References

Gentianaceae
Gentianaceae genera